Runchu (Quechua for shrew opossum, also spelled Runcho) is a  mountain in the Cordillera Central in the Andes of Peru. It is located in the Lima Region, Yauyos Province, on the border of the districts of San Joaquín and Tanta. Runchu lies northwest of Tikllaqucha. It is situated on the western border of the Nor Yauyos-Cochas Landscape Reserve.

References

Mountains of Peru
Mountains of Lima Region